Miltown was an American short-lived American rock band from Boston, Massachusetts, United States.

Biography
The band was formed in 1995 by Jonah Jenkins (Only Living Witness, Milligram, Raw Radar War) and was signed by Larry Jacobson to Irving Azoff’s Giant Records, aka Revolution Records.

Miltown recorded several demo tapes on their own with guitarist/producer Brian McTernan and guitarist Matt Squire, releasing a CDEP (Hydra Head Records), two 7” vinyl records and one album for Revolution Records with producer Toby Wright which was never released.

After protracted internal and record label disputes, the group subsequently split. Jenkins went on to provide vocals for Milligram and Raw Radar War.

Tales of Never Letting Go (unreleased album)
Tales of Never Letting Go was recorded in 1998 and was supposed to be the debut album of Miltown but, due to record label conflicts and negative intra-band dynamics, the band split up before the release. Up to now the album has never been released.

Band members
 Jonah Jenkins - vocals
 Brian McTernan - guitar
 Matt Squire - guitar
 Jay Cannava - bass
 Rob Dulaney - drums

Discography
1997

 They Came From Massachusetts compilation (Big Wheel Recreation) 
Contribution with track "No Matter" - 2:53

1998
 Tales of Never Letting Go unreleased (Revolution Records)

1999
 Up The Dosage compilation (Wonderdrug Records) 
Contribution with track "Can't Leave Home" - 2:34

Unreleased songs 
 "Cleverer" - 2:38
 "End Transmission" - 2:58
 "Unraveling" - 3:12

References

External links
Interview with Jonah Jenkins at Deaf Sparrow
Jonah Jenkins interview at Asice.net
Miltown on Rate Your Music

American post-hardcore musical groups
American alternative metal musical groups
Heavy metal musical groups from Massachusetts
Musical groups from Massachusetts
Musical groups established in 1995
Musical groups disestablished in 1998